Karlsøya can refer to several islands in Norway:

Karlsøya (Møre og Romsdal), an island in Molde municipality, Møre og Romsdal county
Karlsøya (Nord-Trøndelag), an island in Nærøysund municipality, Trøndelag county
Karlsøya (Nordland), an island in Bodø municipality, Nordland county
Karlsøya (Sør-Trøndelag), an island in Ørland municipality, Trøndelag county
Karlsøya (Troms), an island in Karlsøy municipality, Troms og Finnmark county
Karlsøya (Østfold), an island in Sarpsborg municipality, Østfold county

See also
Karlsøy, a municipality in Troms county, Norway